Vincent Wildlife Trust (VWT) was founded in 1975 by the late Honourable Vincent Weir. It is a charity that focuses on mammal conservation in Britain and Ireland. Its Head Office is in Herefordshire, with local offices in south-west England, Wales and Ireland.

Background 

Vincent Weir was the younger son of Andrew Weir, second Baron Inverforth. He was educated at Malvern College and on leaving school, Vincent joined the family firm, the Andrew Weir Group.

In 1975, Vincent established Vincent Wildlife Trust, to focus initially on the status of the otter. Other species the Trust has been or is involved with include the water vole, dormouse, stoat, weasel, polecat, pine marten and the rarer species of bats in Britain, notably the horseshoe bats, Bechstein's bat and barbastelle and in Ireland, the lesser horseshoe bat.

Mammal conservation work

European otter (Lutra lutra) 

National otter surveys of England, Scotland and Wales began in 1977, with the VWT covering Scotland. In the 1980s, VWT again surveyed Scotland and also Wales and Ireland. In the early 1990s, the VWT also took over the surveying of England. The surveys relied on searching for otter spraints. The surveys recorded a level of recovery in Britain's otter population between the first round of surveys in the late 1970s and the third round in the early 1990s.

European water vole (Arvicola amphibius) 

The Trust carried out the first and second national water vole surveys in 1989-1990 and 1996–98. These surveys identified the crash in the water vole population in Britain. Following the publication of the first survey, the water vole was given a degree of legal protection in 1998 under the 1981 Wildlife and Countryside Act. In 2008, a greater level of protection was given in England and Wales. The long-term decline of the water vole resulted from a loss of habitat and changes in farming practices, but the acceleration in the rate of this decline in the 1980s was down to increasing predation by feral American mink. The status of the water vole is now monitored annually by the PTES through the National Water Vole Monitoring programme and is based on those sites originally surveyed by the trust.

Horseshoe bat (Rhinolophus ferrumequinum and Rhinolophus hipposideros) 

The Trust became involved in bat conservation in Britain and Ireland in the 1980s, providing information and advice and helping to set up the network of county Bat Groups that still exists today. In 1980, the Trust purchased a farm building in Devon that is now home to the largest maternity colony of greater horseshoe bats in western Europe. Roost acquisition continued over a period of more than 25 years. Today, the trust still manages 40 horseshoe bat roosts in Britain and Ireland and this also includes, in Wales, the largest maternity colony of lesser horseshoe bats in western Europe. Much of the Trust's bat research has focused on the lesser horseshoe bat, including a number of radio-tracking studies. Population studies include detailed surveys of the lesser horseshoe bat in Ireland. In 2008, the trust published The Lesser Horseshoe Bat Conservation Handbook, a practical guide to the management of lesser horseshoe bat roosts.

European polecat (Mustela putorius) 

The European polecat population in Britain declined following widespread predator control, particularly in the late 19th century. Today, it has recolonised much of its former range. In order to gauge the extent of this range expansion, the Trust has carried out three national polecat distribution surveys since the 1990s, the most recent of which took place during 2014 and 2015. The Trust has carried out research to further understanding of the ecology of the polecat, including live trapping, radio-tracking, investigation of secondary rodenticide poisoning, and genetic analysis of hybridisation between polecats and ferrets.

European pine marten  (Martes martes) 

By the early part of the 20th century, the pine marten in Britain was confined to the North-West Highlands of Scotland and isolated pockets of  the uplands of northern England and Wales. The Trust has been researching and surveying Britain's pine marten population for 30 years, monitoring the population and developing survey methods, including the use of DNA analysis.

In 2015, the Trust's Pine Marten Recovery Project began the translocation of pine martens from Scotland  to mid Wales. Twenty martens were translocated in the autumn of 2015 and their progress monitored through an intensive radio-tracking programme. Further translocations took place in 2016 and 2017 bringing the total to just over 50 animals. These animals continue to be monitored using radio tracking, remote cameras and volunteers collecting scats. In summer 2018, the Trust opened a small pine marten information centre close to Devil's Bridge to tell the story of the return of the pine marten to Wales.

References

External links 
www.vwt.org.uk
www.pine-marten-recovery-project.org.uk
www.mammals-in-ireland.ie
www.waleslink.org

Nature conservation organisations based in the United Kingdom
Mammal conservation